MHK Humenné was a professional Slovak ice hockey club based in Humenné, Slovakia. The club was founded in 1936. Humenné promoted to the Slovak 1. Liga in 2005, first time in club history.

Honours

Domestic
Slovak 2. Liga
  Winners (2): 2004–05, 2017–18
  Runners-up (3): 2013–14, 2014–15, 2016–17

References

External links
 Official club website 
 

Humenné
Ice hockey clubs established in 1936
Sport in Humenné
1936 establishments in Slovakia
2018 disestablishments in Slovakia
Ice hockey teams in Czechoslovakia
Ice hockey clubs disestablished in 2018